Burin—Burgeo was a federal electoral district in Newfoundland and Labrador, Canada, that was represented in the House of Commons of Canada from 1949 to 1979.

This riding was created in 1949 when Newfoundland joined the Canadian Confederation.

It was abolished in 1976 when it was merged into Burin—St. George's riding.

It initially consisted of the Districts of Placentia West, Burin, Fortune Bay-Hermitage, and Burgeo and LaPoile and all the unorganized territory bounded on the North and West by the District of Grand Falls, on the South by the Districts of Burgeo and LaPoile and Fortune Bay-Hermitage, on the East by the Districts of Trinity North, Bonavista South and Bonavista North.

In 1952, it was redefined to consist of the Districts of Placentia West excluding the Iona Islands, Burin, Fortune Bay and Hermitage and Burgeo and LaPoile.

In 1966, it was redefined to consist of the provincial districts of Placentia West, Burin, Burgeo and LaPoile, and those parts of the provincial districts of Fortune Bay, Hermitage, Grand Falls and St. George's not included in the electoral districts of Gander-Twillingate, Grand Falls-White Bay-Labrador and Humber-St. George's-St. Barbe.

The electoral district was abolished in 1976.

Members of Parliament

This riding elected the following Members of Parliament:

Election results

See also 

 List of Canadian federal electoral districts
 Past Canadian electoral districts

External links 
 Riding history for Burin—Burgeo (1949–1976) from the Library of Parliament

Former federal electoral districts of Newfoundland and Labrador